David Hablützel (born 24 April 1996) is a Swiss snowboarder. He competed at the 2014 Winter Olympics in Sochi and the 2022 Winter Olympics in Beijing.

References

External links
 
 
 
 

1996 births
Snowboarders at the 2014 Winter Olympics
Snowboarders at the 2022 Winter Olympics
Living people
Olympic snowboarders of Switzerland
Swiss male snowboarders
Snowboarders at the 2012 Winter Youth Olympics
Place of birth missing (living people)
21st-century Swiss people